Schmölln-Putzkau (German) or Smělna-Póckowy (Upper Sorbian) is a municipality in the district of Bautzen, in Saxony, Germany.

References 

Municipalities in Saxony
Populated places in Bautzen (district)